Paattondru Ketten is a 1991 Indian Tamil-language thriller film written and directed by V. C. Guhanathan. The film stars Rahman and Sithara, with Nizhalgal Ravi, Rekha and Ranjan in supporting roles. It was released on 5 December 1991.

Plot

Cast 
Rahman as Raghu
Sithara
Y. G. Mahendran
Ranjan
Nizhalgal Ravi
Rekha
Sindhu

Soundtrack 
Soundtrack was composed by Maragatha Mani. Lyrics written by Vairamuthu.

Release and reception 
Paattondru Ketten was released on 5 December 1991. N. Krishnaswamy of The Indian Express on his review, dated 6 December 1991, wrote that the script "does not seem to be developing their characters at all" and also criticised the performances of the lead pair. He was citing as indicating that they "don't seem to be serious at all about the role they are portraying".

References

External links 

1990s Tamil-language films
1991 films
1991 thriller films
Films directed by V. C. Guhanathan
Films scored by M. M. Keeravani
Indian thriller films